Phyllobius argentatus is a species of short-nosed weevil commonly known as the silver-green leaf weevil.

Description
Phyllobius argentatus is a slender and elongate weevil, measuring 3.8-6.0 mm in length with bright metallic green scales on its elytra.

Habitat and distribution
Phyllobius argentatus is associated with a broad range of host plant, including examples in the plant families Salicaceae, Rosaceae, Ulmaceae, Fagaceae, and Betulaceae.

It is widely distributed in Europe, where it may be regarded as a pest of fruit trees and hazelnuts where adult beetles may bite holes in leaves and flowers. The damage is, however, rarely important unless it occurs on young trees and nursery stocks.

References

External links
 
 Biodiversity Heritage Library
 Fauna europaea

Entiminae
Beetles of Europe
Beetles described in 1758
Taxa named by Carl Linnaeus